Always: The Very Best of Erasure is the fourth compilation album released by the British synthpop band Erasure. It was released on 30 October 2015 to commemorate their 30th anniversary since the formation of the band. The album contains all of the band's highest charting songs, as well as their more popular recordings. The deluxe edition contains two additional CDs with corresponding remixes, including some of their singles that did not make the compilation. It is available through Lexer Music, Amazon and iTunes. The band's members, Andy Bell and Vince Clarke, announced that this will kick off a campaign to celebrate their thirty years in the music industry together. The compilation followed the release of the first and only single from the album, entitled "Sometimes 2015," a re-vamped version of the original single mixed by David Wrench. The single was released on 23 October 2015, and contains a mixture of previously released remixes of Sometimes as well as a new remix by Love To Infinity.

Track listing

Single disc and digital download
 "Who Needs Love Like That"
 "Oh L'amour"
 "Sometimes"
 "Victim of Love"
 "The Circus"
 "Ship of Fools"
 "Chains of Love"
 "A Little Respect"
 "Stop!"
 "Drama!"
 "Blue Savannah"
 "Chorus"
 "Love to Hate You"
 "Take a Chance on Me"
 "Always"
 "Fingers & Thumbs (Cold Summer's Day)"
 "Breathe"
 "Be with You"
 "Elevation"
 "Sometimes" (2015)

Deluxe edition (disc two)
 "Who Needs Love Like That" (Mexican Mix)
 "Oh L'amour" (PWL Funky Sisters Say "Ooh La La")
 "The Circus" (Grumbling Fur External Eraser Mix)
 "A Little Respect" (Big Train Mix)
 "Stop!" (Vince Clarke Sync 82 Remix)
 "Blue Savannah" (Der Deutsche Mix II)
 "Chorus" (Vegan Mix)
 "Love to Hate You" (LFO Modulated Filter Mix)
 "Always" (Microbots Inside Your Brain Mix)
 "Fingers & Thumbs" (Cold Summer's Day)" (Tin Tin Out Remix)
 "Breathe" (GRN's 'Anticipated' 12" Re-Mix)
 "Elevation" (BT Remix)

Deluxe edition (disc three)
 "Victim of Love" (Vixen Vitesse Remix)
 "Chains of Love" (Vince Clarke Remix)
 "Drama!" (Krucial Remix)
 "You Surround Me" (Mark Saunders Remix)
 "Star" (Interstellar Mix)
 "Am I Right?" (The Grid Remix)
 "Run to the Sun" (Beatmasters' Galactic Remix)
 "In My Arms" (BBE Remix)
 "Freedom" (Mark Picchiotti Strumapella Remix)
 "Be with You" (Starshapes Remix)
 "Sometimes" (Erasure & Flood Mix)

Charts

Certifications

References

2015 compilation albums
Erasure compilation albums